Divine Brown (born September 9, 1974), previously known as Divine Earth Essence, is a Canadian Juno Award-winning R&B and soul singer and theatre performer.

Early life
Brown was born in Toronto, Ontario to Jamaican parents. She first began her singing career singing in local nightclubs. A single mother, she has one daughter.

Career
Brown is known for her 2005 Canadian radio hit "Old Skool Love". The single and video whet the appetites of U.S. Soul music fans, and a Reggae remix version secured the attention of Riddim junkies in Jamaica fueling Divine to reach for something more. The single earned Brown a SOCAN No. 1 Song Award. Even without an album prior to 2005, she was invited to perform at various musical festivals around the world. Her debut album Divine Brown was an underground hit and was fairly successful in the mainstream market. The album was released on the independent Blacksmith label, created by Toronto-based manager Chris Smith. Said Brown to Billboard Magazine, "I spent six years trying to get a label deal...[but] A&R people felt my sound was too mature." She has a five-octave vocal range. Her second album, The Love Chronicles, was released on August 19, 2008 and won a Juno award for best R&B/Soul album of the year in 2009. To date, three singles have been released from the album: "Lay It On the Line", "Meet Me At the Roxy", and "Sunglasses". Brown grew up in Toronto, Ontario. She toured with the Backstreet Boys for their Unbreakable Tour in North America in 2008.

In 2009 Divine Brown took part in an interactive documentary series called City Sonic.  The series, which featured 20 Toronto artists, had Divine perform at Toronto's Rex Hotel. Earlier in 2009 Brown was a headliner at the Keeping the Dream Alive Dr. Martin Luther King Jr tribute concert.

In January 2011, Brown recorded a tribute to Dennis Brown, "Sitting & Watching".  Brown's third album Something Fresh is set to be released in Fall 2013 under Universal Canada. After a three-year hiatus, Divine Brown marks her return to the spotlight with a collection of brand new music for her fans. Executive Produced by Divine and her manager Stephane Lecuyer, "Something Fresh" continues her commitment to the hearty soul music of yore with a bright, contemporary spin courtesy of noted songwriter/producers The Rezza Brothers of Toronto (Obie Trice, DMC, The Commodores). Divine offers that the new album possesses an "old school vibe with a new school twist" and as such, "Something Fresh" draws upon the blueprint of her first two hit albums displaying her retro sensibilities while fully representing today through its lyrical content, musical arrangements and hip-hop inspired production values to be a decidedly fresh contemporary Soul/R&B offering.First single "Gone" is set to release early summer.  "Gone" produced and co-written by the Rezza Brothers. In 2016, Brown performed with Gowan as backup vocalist on a small string of shows in the Toronto area.
In October 2016 Divine Brown announced on social media a brand new single is set to drop titled "Love Alibi" a collaboration with Universal Music Publishing & Songwriting duo 80 Empire. Release date November 1, 2016.

Influences
Brown was influenced heavily by R&B/Soul singers such as Chaka Khan, Patti LaBelle and Aretha Franklin.

Discography
2005: Divine Brown
2008: The Love Chronicles
2013: Something Fresh

Singles

Awards

References

External links

Divine Brown's website

Profile and videos, on the website of MuchMusic

1974 births
Actresses from Toronto
Black Canadian actresses
21st-century Black Canadian women singers
Canadian people of Jamaican descent
Canadian contemporary R&B singers
Canadian soul singers
Canadian stage actresses
Juno Award for R&B/Soul Recording of the Year winners
Living people
Musicians from Toronto
Neo soul singers